The Yeshivah of Flatbush is a Modern Orthodox private Jewish day school located in the Midwood section of Brooklyn, New York. It educates students from age 2 to age 18 and includes an early childhood center, an elementary school and a secondary school.

History
The Yeshivah of Flatbush was founded in 1927 by Joel Braverman, among others. The institution, located on East 10th Street in Midwood, Brooklyn (a neighborhood sometimes identified with nearby Flatbush) at first consisted of an early childhood program, an elementary school and a middle school. The high school, founded in 1950 to complement the elementary school, was originally housed in an adjoining building. In 1962, the high school moved into a new building on nearby Avenue J, and the elementary school expanded into what was formerly the high school building.

Teaching philosophy
The institution combines a Torah education and a secular education for both boys and girls. The school's philosophy is a synthesis of Judaic studies (Bible, Talmud, Jewish Thought) and the liberal arts.

One of the Yeshivah of Flatbush's fundamental tenets is its "Ivrit b'Ivrit" (literally, "Hebrew in Hebrew") philosophy of teaching Judaics. This means that every such class is conducted completely in Hebrew, regardless of the level or ability of students. With this technique, the Yeshivah aims to enable its students to achieve fluency in the Hebrew language.

Student demographics
The Yeshivah of Flatbush comprises Jewish students and teachers from a variety of backgrounds. In the past, more than half of the students were Ashkenazi Jews whose families originated from communities in Germany, Poland, Eastern Europe and Russia. In recent years, the majority has shifted to students of Sephardic and Mizrahi Jewish descent. The overwhelming number of Sephardic students can be attributed to the growth of the Syrian Jewish community in Flatbush, and the decline in Ashkenazi enrollment can be attributed to the movement of Modern Orthodox communities to Long Island and New Jersey, with a concomitant increase in the number and quality of Jewish day schools and yeshivot in those areas. In 2022, the lower school consisted of 1,400 students.

Post-high school

Many graduates participate in year-long programs at yeshivot, seminaries and volunteer organizations in Israel for a year. Afterwards, some continue their studies in similar institutions, enroll in university or enlist in the Israel Defense Forces for another year or more. However, most come back to the United States for university. Graduates of the Yeshivah of Flatbush have studied at universities and colleges across the country, from Tulane to the University of Maryland and Boston University to Yale. Some of the most popular universities among Flatbush's alumni, including Yeshiva University and the City University of New York, grant as much as a year's worth of credit to students who study in Israel for a year, allowing them to apply these credits to their undergraduate degree. A large number of students graduate with college credit due to the many Advanced Placement Program (AP) courses offered in the Junior, Senior, and more recently Sophomore years of high school.

Leadership
David Eliach was the principal emeritus, following a decades-long tenure as principal of the high school. In later years, Raymond Harari, an alumnus of Yeshivah of Flatbush High School, served as the "head of school" of the high school, followed by Joseph Beyda.

The Elementary School was formerly led by Lawrence Schwed.

Student government
Each spring, the student body of the Yeshivah of Flatbush High School elects four juniors to positions in the Student Government Organization (SGO). These students assume their respective positions the following fall. The SGO plans various trips and other activities for students throughout the year. The SGO also organizes and plans Color War, which occurred recently for the first time, two years in a row.

The Senior Council is similarly chosen every year. Juniors elect four of their peers to lead them into and during their last year in the high school. The council's responsibilities include collecting senior dues and planning the wintertime Senior Ski Trip, the springtime Senior Trip, and the year-ending Senior Dinner.

Community interaction
Each year, the Yeshivah holds events that cater to the New York Jewish community. The largest ones include the annual Yom HaShoah (Holocaust Remembrance day) and Yom Ha'atzma'ut (Israel Independence Day) programs, which traditionally feature performances by the high school's Choir and Chamber Choir, now under the direction of Brian Gelfand. In addition to this a 9/11 memorial program is held annually.

Each month, there is the Sunday Morning Learning program where students, faculty, and alumni get together for prayers, breakfast, and a faculty-prepared presentation of given texts. In addition to this there are also many alumni and members of the community come to help at programs.

Music and the arts
Since the early 1990s, the yeshivah has gained acclaim through its high school and chamber choirs. Under the direction of Daniel Henkin until the year 2007, the choral program at the yeshivah has been featured at venues ranging from New York city hall, Brooklyn city hall, The Jewish Heritage Museum, and others. Their repertoire spans across genres which include arrangements of both secular and religious pieces. In 2008, Daniel Henkin resigned as choir director and assumed a position at the Ramaz Upper School in Manhattan. Henkin was replaced by Brian Gelfand, and was eventually replaced by Mordy Weinstein who directs the choir to date.
The school also has a production of musicals performed in Hebrew each year by a select amount of talented students. The students both write these plays and translate them from English to Hebrew, as well as star in these plays each year. They've had many plays such as: Little Shop of Horrors, Frozen, Beauty and the Beast, and many more. The Safe Program teacher for the high school students joined in on the fun last year and performed as an opera singing closet in Beauty and the Beast. During a production of one of their plays, someone fell off the stage and continued acting as if nothing happened.

In addition to this Flatbush High School has a two-year art class and one year music class built into the school curriculum.

Sports
The Flatbush Falcons compete in a number of sports: the hockey, basketball and volleyball, and bowling teams compete in the fall, while the softball, pickleball, soccer, and boys varsity volleyball squads play in the spring; the swim, badminton, and tennis teams compete year-round. In most cases, teams are members of the Metropolitan Yeshiva High School Athletic League, which represents many of the Jewish day schools in the New York area.

The Flatbush Varsity Tennis Team won their first championship ever in June, 2017 beating Heschel 3–2. Players like Meyer Tawil, Joe Benhaim, and Meyer Kassin led the team to victory.

Two basketball tournaments are held every year. The Thomas Hausdorff Memorial Basketball Tournament in November brings the male junior varsity teams of three American Jewish high schools to Brooklyn for a weekend of competition and solidarity. At the Marc Sackin Memorial Basketball Tournament in December, the varsity team competes against other New York-area Jewish high schools. Hausdorff was a former principal of the school; Sackin was a student killed just days before his scheduled graduation in 1973.

Academic teams
The Yeshivah of Flatbush's academic teams compete in a wide range of areas. Some of the teams include: debate, Mock Trial, Model Congress, the Yeshiva University National Model United Nations, Envirothon, chess, mathematics, College Bowl and Torah Bowl.

Publications
The Phoenix – Student newspaper
Imrei Shefer – A D'var Torah weekly (Hebrew)first initiated in 1974 by Marc Lichtenthal ז’ל a member of the Class of 1975.
Haaretz V'haam – An Israel-affairs newspaper
Summit – Senior yearbook
"Pegasus" – A liberal arts pamphlet

Notable alumni

 Howard Apfel, rabbi and noted expert on medical halacha and ethics in Ramat Bet Shemesh Alef
 Robert J. Avrech, Emmy Award-winning screenwriter
 David Berger, academic, expert in medieval Jewish history
 David Bernstein (born 1967), Professor, George Mason University School of Law and author
 Lee Bienstock (born 1983), finalist on The Apprentice 5.
 Baruch Samuel Blumberg (1925-2011), recipient of the 1976 Nobel Prize in Physiology or Medicine, identified the Hepatitis B virus 
 Chaim Brovender, rosh yeshivah of Yeshivat HaMivtar
 Abraham Foxman (born 1940), former director (1987-2015) of the Anti-Defamation League.
 Gideon Gartner (born 1936), founder of the Gartner Group
 Baruch Goldstein, perpetrator of the Cave of the Patriarchs massacre.
 Judith Hauptman (born 1943), feminist Talmudic scholar and professor at the Jewish Theological Seminary of America
 Neal Hendel, Israeli Supreme Court Justice
 Yehuda Henkin (1945-2020), noted Israeli posek
 Meir Kahane (1932–1990) (Elementary school graduate), founder of the Jewish Defense League and former Israeli Knesset member.  Head of the Kach party
 Eric Kandel (born 1929), 2000 Nobel Prize laureate in Physiology or Medicine
 Elihu Katz (born 1926), American sociologist and founder of Israeli television
 Ira Katznelson (born 1944), American political scientist and historian, currently Ruggles Professor at Columbia University, and previously president of the Social Science Research Council and the American Political Science Association. He is a fellow of the American Academy of Arts and Sciences. 
 Ezra Labaton (1950-2013), Modern Orthodox Rabbi, Philosopher, Educator, and Founding Rabbi of Congregation Magen David of West Deal
 Naomi Levy, member of the first class of women to enter the Jewish Theological Seminary of America, bestselling author and founder of Nashuva, The Jewish Spiritual Outreach Movement
 Isaac Mizrahi (born 1961), fashion designer
 Bertram L. Podell (1925–2005), former member of the United States House of Representatives from New York
 Dennis Prager (born 1948), public speaker and radio talk show host.
 Kenneth Prager, physician
 Samuel Schafler (1929-1991), rabbi, historian, editor and Jewish educator
 Charlie Shrem, American entrepreneur, bitcoin advocate, and convicted felon
 Daniel Sperber, professor of Talmud at Bar-Ilan University and winner of the Israel Prize in 1992
 Joseph Telushkin (born 1948), author and speaker on Jewish topics
 Elana Maryles Sztokman, author, researcher, feminist activist
 Bruce Wasserstein (1947–2009), investment banker, businessman, and writer
 Wendy Wasserstein (1950-2006), playwright
 Larry Weinberg, former president of AIPAC and former owner of the Portland Trail Blazers
 Leon Wieseltier (born 1952), writer, editor of The New Republic
 Joel B. Wolowelsky, author and current Dean of the Faculty at the Yeshivah of Flatbush High School
 Alan Zelenetz (former Principal), co-founder of Ovie Entertainment, and comic book writer for Marvel Comics
 Efraim Zuroff (born 1948), Director of the Simon Wiesenthal Center, Israel

References

External links

 

Educational institutions established in 1927
Jewish day schools in New York (state)
Midwood, Brooklyn
Modern Orthodox Jewish day schools in the United States
Orthodox yeshivas in Brooklyn
Private elementary schools in Brooklyn
Private high schools in Brooklyn
Private middle schools in Brooklyn
Private K-12 schools in New York City
1927 establishments in New York City